The Napoli–Aversa railway (also known as Rainbow line as each station is identified by a different colour, Alifana bassa, or sometimes Line 11) is a rapid transit line that connects Naples with its northern suburbs.

Route 
The line connects Naples (Piscinola station) to the town of Aversa. Only Piscinola station (shared with line 1) is within the municipality of Naples.

Management 
The line is managed by Ente Autonomo Volturno (EAV) company.

History 
The first section of the line, between Piscinola and Mugnano, was opened in 2005.

In 2009, the line was extended from Mugnano to Aversa Centro, with two intermediate stops in Giugliano and Aversa Ippodromo.

Service 
Trains usually travel every 15 minutes, and every 10 minutes during peak hours.

See also 
 Naples Metro
 List of suburban and commuter rail systems

Notes 

Railway lines in Campania
Transport in Naples
Aversa
Railway lines opened in 2005